Athgoe Hill
 Ballybetagh Hill
 Ballymorefinn Hill
 Barnaslingan
 Ben of Howth
 Black Hill
 Carrickgollogan
 Corrig Mountain
 Cruagh Mountain
 Dalkey Hill
 Glassamucky Mountain
 Glendoo Mountain
 Holtrass Hill
 Killakee Mountain
 Killegar
 Killiney Hill
 Kilmashogue
 Kippure
 Knockananiller Hill
 Knockandinny (or Crockaunadreenagh)
 Knockannavea
 Knockanvinidee
 Knocknagun
 Lugg
 Lugmore
 Montpelier Hill
 Mountseskin
 Naul Hills
 Newtown Hill
 Piperstown
 Prince William's Seat
 Saggart Hill (or Slieve Thoul)
 Seahan
 Seefin
 Seefingan
 Shamrogue Hill
 Shielmartin Hill
 Slievenabawnoge
 Tallaght Hill
 Three Rock
 Tibradden Mountain
 Two Rock
 Verschoyles Hill

See also
 
 List of mountains in Ireland

Dublin

Mountains